The Venetian Prealps (Prealpi Venete in Italian) are a mountain range in the south-eastern part of the Alps. They are located in Triveneto, in the north-eastern part of Italy.

Geography 
Administratively the range is divided between the Italian provinces of Trento (in the Region of Trentino Alto Adige), Verona, Vicenza, Treviso, Belluno (in the Region of Veneto) and Pordenone (in the Region of Friuli Venezia Giulia).

The Venetian Prealps are drained by the rivers Adige, Brenta, Piave and other minor rivers and streams, all of them tributaries of the Adriatic sea.

Summits

The chief summits of the Venetian prealps are:

Maps
 Italian official cartography (Istituto Geografico Militare - IGM); on-line version: www.pcn.minambiente.it

External links
 Grappa and Prealpi
 Prealpi Veronesi (Baldo,Carega,Lessinia,Valpolicella)

Mountain ranges of the Alps
Mountain ranges of Italy
Landforms of Friuli-Venezia Giulia
Landforms of Trentino-Alto Adige/Südtirol
Landforms of Veneto
Province of Pordenone
Province of Verona
Province of Vicenza
Province of Treviso
Province of Belluno
Trentino